Jan Skoczylas (born 24 September 1951) is a Polish equestrian. He competed in two events at the 1972 Summer Olympics.

References

1951 births
Living people
Polish male equestrians
Olympic equestrians of Poland
Equestrians at the 1972 Summer Olympics
People from Olesno County